Glipostenoda freyi is a species of beetle in the genus Glipostenoda. It was described in 1962.

References

freyi
Beetles described in 1962